"Keep The Ball Rollin'" is a song written by Denny Randell and Sandy Linzer was recorded by Jay & the Techniques.

Chart performance
"Keep The Ball Rollin" reached NO. 14 on the Billboard Hot 100 in 1967.

Other recordings
Al Hirt released a version of the song in January 1968. His version reached No. 100 on the Billboard Hot 100 and No. 10 on the Easy Listening chart.

References

1967 songs
1967 singles
1968 singles
Al Hirt songs
Songs written by Sandy Linzer
Songs written by Denny Randell
Smash Records singles